Conde Balcom McCullough (May 30, 1887 – May 6, 1946) was an American civil engineer who is primarily known for designing many of Oregon's coastal bridges on U.S. Route 101. The native of South Dakota worked for the Oregon Department of Transportation from 1919 to 1935 and 1937 until he died in 1946. McCullough also was a professor at Oregon State University.

Early life
Conde McCullough was born in Redfield, South Dakota, on May 30, 1887. In 1891, he and his family moved to Iowa where his father died in 1904. McCullough then worked at various jobs to support the family. In 1910, he graduated from Iowa State University with a civil engineering degree.

Career

McCullough began working for the Marsh Bridge Company in Des Moines, Iowa, where he remained for one year. He then went to work for the Iowa State Highway Commission. He moved to Oregon in 1916 and became an assistant professor of civil engineering at Oregon Agricultural College, and the sole structural engineering professor at the school. In 1919 he became the head of the Bridge Division of the Oregon Department of Transportation, making him personally responsible for the design of Oregon's bridges at a time when the state was completing Highway 101. His first bridge ODT was the bridge in the town called Rock Point 1919. Concrete pillars are still visible on both sides of the Rogue River.

His designs are well known for their architectural beauty. McCullough advocated that bridges be built economically, efficiently, and with beauty. He helped design over 600 bridges, many with architectural details such as Gothic spires, art deco obelisks, and Romanesque arches incorporated into the bridges. In 1928, he graduated from Willamette University College of Law and passed the bar the same year. In 1935 he moved to San José, Costa Rica to help design bridges on the Pan-American Highway. He returned to Oregon in 1937 to become the assistant state highway engineer.

Later life and legacy
In 1934 McCullough was granted an honorary doctorate from Oregon State University. He published The Engineer at Law with his son John McCullough who also was an attorney. McCullough died of a stroke at his home in Salem, Oregon on May 6, 1946. He was close to his 59th birthday. He was interred in the Mount Crest Abbey Mausoleum at City View Cemetery in Salem. His wife Marie was interred there after her death in 1954. Following McCullough's death, the state of Oregon renamed the "North Bend Bridge" in his honor.

Bridges designed by McCullough

See also 
 Samuel Hill
 Glenn Jackson
 Robert Moses

References

External links
 
 American Society of Civil Engineering profile
 Oregon State University profile
 

1887 births
1946 deaths
People from Redfield, South Dakota
American bridge engineers
Architects from Oregon
Oregon State University faculty
Oregon lawyers
Willamette University College of Law alumni
Iowa State University alumni
History of transportation in Oregon
20th-century American lawyers